Hypotia lobalis is a species of snout moth in the genus Hypotia. It was described by Pierre Chrétien in 1915 and is known from Algeria and Iran.

References

Moths described in 1915
Hypotiini